Franjo Škrinjar (17 May 1920 – 19 February 1989) was a Yugoslav long-distance runner. He competed in the marathon at the 1960 Summer Olympics, placing 10th.

References

External links
 
 Franjo Škrinjar on pages of the Croatian Olympic Committee

1920 births
1989 deaths
Athletes (track and field) at the 1960 Summer Olympics
Yugoslav male long-distance runners
Yugoslav male marathon runners
Olympic athletes of Yugoslavia
People from Međimurje County